Badroulbadour / Badr ul-Badour / Badr al-Badur ("full moon of full moons") is a princess whom Aladdin married in The Story of Aladdin; or, the Wonderful Lamp. Her name uses the full moon as a metaphor for female beauty, which is common in Arabic literature and throughout the Arabian Nights.

When Aladdin finds a magic lamp, he discovers it contains a jinni bound to do the bidding of the person holding the lamp. With the aid of the jinni, Aladdin—an impoverished young man who, in other circumstances, could not have aspired to marry a princess—becomes rich and powerful and marries Princess Badroulbadour.

In Disney's Aladdin, her name was changed to Jasmine and she was made an Arabian princess. She is also mentioned in a poem by Wallace Stevens called "The Worms at Heaven's Gate" in his book Harmonium. She is a character in the children's novel Wishing Moon by Michael O. Tunnell, and is portrayed as a scheming, black-hearted villainess.

The name Badroulbadour also appears in the novels The Good Soldier by Ford Madox Ford, and The Turmoil by Booth Tarkington (as Princess Bedrulbudour), and Come Dance with Me by Russell Hoban. Hoban also mentions Badoura as the name of an Arabian princess in The Arabian Nights. Monica Baldwin, in her novel The Called and the Chosen, uses the name Badroulbadour for the Siamese cat who belonged to her heroine, Ursula, before she became a nun.

References

Aladdin
Fictional princesses
One Thousand and One Nights characters
Fictional Arabs
Fictional people from Baghdad